Wolfgang Gönnenwein (29 January 1933 – 26 July 2015) was a German conductor and an academic teacher.

Biography 
Born in Schwäbisch Hall, Wolfgang Gönnenwein studied music and German studies at the University of Heidelberg and the University of Tübingen. In 1959 he became the conductor of the choir  (South German Madrigal Chorus).

In 1968 he was appointed Professor for choral conducting at the Staatliche Hochschule für Musik und Darstellende Kunst Stuttgart, in 1973 he was elected Rektor (president), serving until 1982. He also directed the Ludwigsburger Schlossfestspiele until 2004.

He was Generalintendant (General Manager) of the Staatstheater Stuttgart from 1985 to 1992.

For EMI, Gönnenwein recorded many of Bach's sacred works, including the St Matthew Passion, as well as Haydn's oratorios and Mozart's Requiem.  

Gönnenwein died on 26 July 2015 at the age of 82.

References

External links 
 Wolfgang Gönnenwein website
 Wolfgang Gönnenwein on the website of the Kölner Bach-Verein (in German)
 Entries for Wolfgang Gönnenwein on WorldCat

1933 births
2015 deaths
Bach conductors
People from Schwäbisch Hall
German choral conductors
German male conductors (music)
Academic staff of the University of Stuttgart
Academic staff of the State University of Music and Performing Arts Stuttgart
Recipients of the Order of Merit of Baden-Württemberg